Wachwani (Quechua wachwa Andean goose, Aymara -ni a suffix to indicate ownership, "the one with the Andean goose", Hispanicized spelling Huachhuani) is a mountain in the Andes of Peru, about  high. It is situated in the Ayacucho Region, Parinacochas Province, Coracora District.

References 

Mountains of Peru
Mountains of Ayacucho Region